Gvozno Lake is a quazi-natural lake in Bosnia and Herzegovina on the mountain Treskavica. It is located in the municipality of Kalinovik.

See also
List of lakes in Bosnia and Herzegovina

References

Lakes of Bosnia and Herzegovina